Frederick James Wah, OC, (born January 23, 1939) is a Canadian poet, novelist, scholar and former Canadian Parliamentary Poet Laureate.

Life
Wah was born in Swift Current, Saskatchewan, but grew up in the interior (West Kootenay) of British Columbia. His father was born in Canada and raised in China, the son of a Chinese father and a Scots-Irish mother. Wah's mother was a Swedish-born Canadian who came to Canada at age 6. His diverse ethnic makeup figures significantly in his writings.

Wah studied literature and music at the University of British Columbia. While there, he was a founding editor and contributor to TISH. He later did graduate work at the University of New Mexico in Albuquerque and University at Buffalo, The State University of New York. He has taught at Selkirk College, David Thompson University Centre, and the University of Calgary. Well known for his work on literary journals and small-press, Wah has been a contributing editor to Open Letter since its beginning, involved in the editing of West Coast Line, and with Frank Davey edited the world's first online literary magazine, SwiftCurrent. Wah won the 'Governor General's Award' for his 1985 book "Waiting for Saskatchewan".

Wah retired after 40 years of teaching and lives in Vancouver, British Columbia with his wife Pauline Butling. He remains active writing and performing public readings of his poetry. From 2006 to 2007, he served as the Writer-in-Residence at Simon Fraser University in Burnaby, British Columbia.

On December 20, 2011, Wah was appointed as Canada's Parliamentary Poet Laureate.  He is the fifth poet to hold this office. In 2013 he was made an Officer in the Order of Canada.

Education 
 Bachelor of Arts - English Literature and Music - University of British Columbia
 Master of Arts - Literature and Linguistics - University at Buffalo, The State University of New York

Awards 
 Waiting for Saskatchewan - 1985 (1985 Governor General's Award for poetry)
 So Far - 1991 (1982 Stephanson Award for Poetry)
 Diamond Grill - 1996 (Writers Guild of Alberta Howard O'Hagan Prize for Short Fiction)
 Faking It - 2001 (Association for Canadian and Québec Literatures Gabrielle Roy Prize for Criticism)
 Is A Door - 2010 (Dorothy Livesay B.C. Book Prize for poetry)

Bibliography
 Lardeau (1965)
 Mountain (1967)
 Among (1972)
 Tree (1972)
 Earth (1974)
 Pictograms from the Interior of B.C. (1975)
 Selected Poems: Loki is Buried at Smoky Creek (1980)
 Owners Manual (1981)
 Breathin' My Name With a Sigh Talonbooks, 1981,  
 Grasp The Sparrow's Tail (1982)
 Waiting for Saskatchewan Turnstone Press Canada, 1985,  
 The Swift Current Anthology (1986; edited with Frank Davey)
 Rooftops (1987)
 Music at the Heart of Thinking (1987)
 Limestone Lakes Utaniki (1989)
 So Far (1991)
 Alley Alley Home Free (1992)
 Diamond Grill Edmonton: NeWest Press, 1996; NeWest, 2006,  
 Faking It: Poetics and Hybridity Critical Writing 1984-1999. NeWest Press, 2000,  
 Isadora Blue (La Mano Izquierda Impressora, Victoria, 2005)
 Articulations (Nomados, Vancouver, 2007)
 Sentenced to Light (2008)
 is a door Talonbooks, 2009. 
 Permissions: Tish Poetics 1963 Thereafter- (Vancouver: Ronsdale Press, 2014) 33 pp. 
 Scree: The Collected Earlier Poems 1962-1991 (Vancouver: Talonbooks, 2015) 633 pp. 
 Music at the Heart of Thinking a poetry collection published in July 2020.
 A Door to be Kicked: A Radio Play by Fred Wah a radio play script authored by Fred Wah based on the Diamond Grill. The radio play was produced and recorded by Kootenay Co-op Radio in February 2022

Criticism

Banting, Pamela.  Body Inc.: A Theory of Translation Poetics.  Winnipeg: Turnstone Press, 1995.
Diehl-Jones, Charlene. Fred Wah and His Works. Toronto: ECW Press, 1996.
 
 John Z. Ming Chen: The Influence of Daoism on Asian-Canadian Writers.  Mellen, 2008.

References

External links 
 The Fred Wah Digital Archive
 University of Toronto Canadian Poets Profile
 Ryerson University Asian Heritage in Canada Authors
 FFWD:WEEKLY: Tough-Minded poet Fred Wah leaves legacy at U of C
 Wah Writers' Union Membership Page
 Fred Wah, Electronic Poetry Center
 Records of Fred Wah are held by Simon Fraser University's Special Collections and Rare Books
 Recordings of Fred Wah are available online in the Unarchiving the Margins Collection at Simon Fraser University's Special Collection and Rare Books
 A Door to be Kicked: A Radio Play by Fred Wah

1939 births
20th-century Canadian poets
Canadian male poets
21st-century Canadian poets
Canadian people of Chinese descent
Canadian Parliamentary Poets Laureate
Canadian writers of Asian descent
Canadian people of Irish descent
Canadian people of Scottish descent
Canadian people of Swedish descent
Governor General's Award-winning poets
Living people
Officers of the Order of Canada
People from Nelson, British Columbia
People from Swift Current
People from the Regional District of Kootenay Boundary
Academic staff of Simon Fraser University
University at Buffalo alumni
University of British Columbia alumni
Academic staff of the University of Calgary
20th-century Canadian male writers
21st-century Canadian male writers